Fidel Manrique is a Spanish anarcho-syndicalist associated with the Confederación Nacional del Trabajo (CNT) confederation of labor unions.

In 1980, Manrique was sentenced to 6.5 years' imprisonment for robbing a bank in Valladolid two years prior. He and others professed to the robbery, which they committed to fund the CNT.

References 

Secretaries General of the Confederación Nacional del Trabajo
Spanish anarchists
Anarcho-syndicalists
Living people
1950 births